Jaicheng Jai Dohutia is an Indian film director, editor, writer and cinematographer from Tongo, a small, isolated village in Tinsukia district, Assam. He is an alumnus of Jyoti Chitraban Film & Television Institute, Guwahati currently known as Dr. Bhupen Hazarika Regional Government Film and Television Institute.

Filmography

Awards

References

External links

Living people
Assamese film producers
1982 births
Assamese-language film directors
Writers from Guwahati
21st-century Indian film directors
Artists from Guwahati
Film directors from Assam
Best Foreign Language Film Academy Award winners